The Slovakia men's national ball hockey team is the men's national ball hockey team of Slovakia, and a member of the International Street and Ball Hockey Federation (ISBHF).

World Championships

External links 
http://www.hokejbal.sk/
 ISBHF Official Site

Ball hockey
Men's sport in Slovakia